The following is a list of motor cars manufactured by the Daimler Company and its successors.

Veteran (prior to 1904)
All Veteran Daimlers had side valves and chain drive except the Critchley Light car, which had belt drive.

Edwardian (1905–1918)
During the Edwardian era, Daimler licensed and developed the Knight sleeve-valve system. Also during this era, Daimler switched from chain to shaft drive, first using conventional bevel gears, and then, from 1909, using worm gears.

Vintage (1919–1930)
All Vintage Daimlers had sleeve valves and worm final drive.

1930s
Daimler had introduced their patented Daimler Fluid Flywheel matched with Wilson preselector gearboxes across the range by the beginning of this decade. New engines returned to poppet valves, worm final drive continued throughout the decade into the 1950s.

Military vehicles

Post-WWII BSA (1945–1960)
Daimler returned to bevel gear final drive with the big cars of 1946 and later replaced their fluid flywheel and epicyclic gearbox with Borg-Warner automatic transmissions.

Owned by Jaguar (1960–1966)
BSA sold Daimler to Jaguar in 1960. Development of Daimler cars continued, but some "Daimler-ised" Jaguars were introduced as well.

Owned by BMC/BMH/British Leyland/Austin Rover (1966–1984)

Owned by Jaguar (1984–1989)

1986–1992 Daimler XJ40 new car and new engine as prescribed by British Leyland, the 1986 XJ40 Jaguar body could not accept Jaguar's V12 engine
1992–1994 Daimler Majestic XJ340 wheelbase extended ; 3.2- and 4-litre engines
1992–1994 Daimler Majestic Double-Six XJ381 6-litre engine. Intended to take 75% of group V12 sales

Owned by Ford (1989–2007)

1994–2002 Daimler X300 and X330 body returns to a more recognisable shape. V8 from 1997
1996 Daimler Century limited edition: 50 V12, 50 straight 6; marking 100 years of Daimler Coventry
2002–2005 Daimler Super V8 X350 V8 engine, alloy structure
2005 Daimler Super Eight

Notes

References

Citations

Sources

Daimler Company
British Leyland
Jaguar Cars
Jaguar Land Rover
Daimler automobiles, List of